James Baird Murphy (born 29 November 1942) is a Scottish former professional footballer who played in the Football League, as an inside forward.

References

External links
Profile at ENFA

1942 births
Living people
Footballers from Glasgow
Scottish footballers
Association football inside forwards
Alloa Athletic F.C. players
Heart of Midlothian F.C. players
Raith Rovers F.C. players
Notts County F.C. players
Motherwell F.C. players
Hamilton Academical F.C. players
East Stirlingshire F.C. players
English Football League players
Scottish Football League players
Larkhall Thistle F.C. players